The Mystery of the Great Pyramid, Volume 1: Manetho's Papyrus by the Belgian artist Edgar P. Jacobs was the fourth comic book in the Blake and Mortimer series, first published in Tintin magazine from March 23, 1950 to February 21, 1951. It appeared in book format in 1954, then was reprinted in a single-volume edition with Part 2 in 2011.

Synopsis
Professor Philip Mortimer is going to Cairo, Egypt for a holiday. He soon gets mixed up in a weird business with ancient papyrus, heretic kings, lost treasures, an old nemesis, and the murder of his friend, Captain Blake.

Plot
Invited by his friend, Egyptian Egyptologist Ahmed Rasim Bey, Philip Mortimer, accompanied by Nasir his servant, arrives in Cairo. Rasim Bey and his assistant Ben Zaim Abdul then show him a papyrus by Manetho, speaking about the Chamber of Horus and the Treasure of Aton. For Mortimer, there's no doubt there is in the Great Pyramid of Cheops an unknown secret room where the tomb of Akhenaten and his treasure lie hidden. But Mortimer discovers that Ben Zaim had hidden some of the papyrus and recovers it. One evening, Mortimer comes to the museum, to trap Ben Zaim and recover from him the document he lost when he was knocked out by Olrik, believed to have died during the destruction of Lhasa (in The Secret of the Swordfish, Volume 3). Mortimer is then determined to assist Commissioner Kamal, head of the Cairo police, to get hold of the members of the trafficking network which includes antique thief Olrik and Ben Zaim and well in Olrik has a length of ahead of him (having stolen the papyrus after stunning him). While it took Ben Zaim, Mortimer discovers a track in an antique shop whose assistant is a regular. He is greeted more than brutal Youssef, the seller, and Razul, supposed to have died in the Battle of the Strait of Hormuz, both members of the trafficking network. Mortimer then narrowly escapes Olrik.

It is the turn of Olrik to pass by the arrest because of an error of Ben Zaim. Olrik having put him to death, Commissioner Kamal decides not to listen to Mortimer, who is then forced to call his friend Francis Blake to the rescue to assist in its investigation. Meanwhile, Blake, Mortimer visits the Giza plateau where he meets the eccentric German Egyptologist, Dr. Großgrabenstein and second, the American Sharkey, who is none other than the henchman of Olrik. The first meeting between the man and Mortimer is pretty brutal because the second rescues a mysterious old man named Sheik Abdel Razek. At the end of Volume 1, Mortimer and Nasir learn that Blake was murdered during his stopover at Athens airport, and swear vengeance.

Translations

English

The Mystery of the Great Pyramid, Vol. 1 was first published in English by Les Editions Blake and Mortimer in 1987.</ref> Comcat Comics planned to publish an English version in 1990, under the title Secret of the Great Pyramid, Vol 1, but the company went bankrupt before it could come out. Cinebook Ltd published a translation in November 2007 .

References

Blake and Mortimer
Works originally published in Tintin (magazine)
Literature first published in serial form
Ancient Egypt in fiction
Fiction set in 1950
Comics set in Egypt
Comics set in deserts
1954 books
Cultural depictions of Akhenaten